Yuriy Yakovenko (born 3 September 1993) is a Ukrainian professional footballer who plays as a forward.

Career
Yakovenko is product of youth team systems of FC Arsenal Kyiv, but in July 2010 transferred to other Kyivan club Obolon. He made his debut for FC Obolon Kyiv entering as a substituted player in game against FC Chornomorets Odesa on 31 October 2011 in Ukrainian Premier League.

On 27 July 2017, Yakovenko signed with Danish club Esbjerg FB. On 9 July 2021 Esbjerg confirmed, that Yakovenko, alongside three teammates, had been removed from the first team and sent down to train with the U19s. It came in the wake of a riot between players from the squad and the club's new coach, Peter Hyballa. According to Danish media, the squad was very dissatisfied with the coach's methods, describing it as Hyballa was ... photographing players in underpants, punching the players, shaming them in front of their teammates, verbal torture and a training program so hard that the injuries was rolling in. After Hyballa decided to resign, Yakovenko was promoted to the first team squad again in mid-August. He left the club as a free agent as his contract expired in December 2021.

Yakovenko signed a one-year contract with recently promoted Eliteserien club HamKam on 24 February 2022.

Personal life
He is the younger son of the former Ukrainian footballer and current coach Pavlo Yakovenko. His older brother Oleksandr Yakovenko is also a footballer.

References

External links
Profile at FFU Official Site (Ukr)

1993 births
Living people
Sportspeople from Montbéliard
Ukrainian footballers
Ukraine under-21 international footballers
Association football forwards
FC Obolon-Brovar Kyiv players
FC Obolon-2 Kyiv players
AC Ajaccio players
Anorthosis Famagusta F.C. players
Esbjerg fB players
Hamarkameratene players
Ligue 1 players
Ukrainian Premier League players
Cypriot First Division players
Danish Superliga players
Danish 1st Division players
Eliteserien players
Footballers from Bourgogne-Franche-Comté
Expatriate footballers in France
Expatriate footballers in Cyprus
Ukrainian expatriate footballers
Expatriate men's footballers in Denmark
Expatriate footballers in Norway
Ukrainian expatriate sportspeople in France
Ukrainian expatriate sportspeople in Cyprus
Ukrainian expatriate sportspeople in Denmark
Ukrainian expatriate sportspeople in Norway
Ukraine youth international footballers